The Samsung Galaxy A70 and A70s are a series of Android phablets manufactured by Samsung Electronics as part of its fifth-generation Galaxy A series lineup. The phones feature Android 9 (Pie) with Samsung's proprietary One UI skin, 128 GB of internal storage, and a 4500 mAh battery. The A70 was unveiled in South Korea on April 19, 2019.

Specifications

Hardware

The Samsung Galaxy A70 and A70s have a 6.7” FHD+ (1080×2400) Super AMOLED Infinity-U Display with a U-shaped notch for the frontal camera, similar to the Galaxy A50. The phone has 6GB and 8GB RAM versions, and has 128GB of internal storage that is expandable to, at least, 1 TB via microSD card.

The phone measures 164.3 × 76.7 × 7.9 mm (6.47 × 3.02 × 0.31 in) and weighs 183 g, featuring a 4500 mAh battery.

The phone also has a dual-SIM model, 3.5mm headphone jack, and supports, 25W Super Fast Charger with a USB C cable.

Camera
The phone has a triple-lens camera consisting of a 32MP f/1.7 wide-angle lens, 8MP f/2.2 ultra-wide angle lens, and a 5MP 3D depth sensor. The triple-lens camera can create a bokeh effect through the 3D depth sensor. There is a 32MP f/2.0 selfie camera. The camera also has Samsung's scene optimizer technology that recognizes 20 different scenes and automatically adjusts the camera. The phone also can record 4K and super-slow motion video through the camera application.

Software
The Samsung Galaxy A70 series runs on Android Pie with Samsung's One UI skin that repositions the touch area in stock Samsung apps towards the bottom, making the interface easier for one handed use with a large screen. Features include Bixby, Google Assistant, Samsung Health, and Samsung Pay, although the Bixby button is not included.

 On December 2, 2020, Samsung released a list of numerous Galaxy devices that would be eligible for the One UI 3-Android 11 upgrade, of which the A70 was included. The A70 should receive the update around May 2021 (although this usually depends by country), which is likely to be the last major Android upgrade for the Galaxy A70.

Galaxy A70s
On September 27, 2019, an improved version of the A70, the A70s, was released in India. The phone has the same specs as the A70, except for improvements in the camera and changed design. The 32MP f/1.7 main camera has been changed to a 64MP f/1.8 main camera that can bind four pixels into one, creating a 16MP image that improves low-light performance. The phone also features super steady video like the Samsung Galaxy Note 10 and a night mode. The design of the phone has been changed into a "3D Prism" design with a glossy back.

Successor
The A71 was announced on December 12, 2019 as a successor to the original A70 series. The device has an Infinity-O display with the same size and resolution as the A70 and A70s, a new macro camera and higher resolution ultrawide camera, Android 10 standard, new color options, and a more powerful Snapdragon 730 SoC. It was released on January 31, 2020.

Reception
The Galaxy A70 was met with positive reviews by critics. Nathan Spendelow and Matt Breen of Expert Reviews gave a score of 5 out of 5, calling it Samsung's best mid-range phone and praising its triple camera array, 4500mah battery, and display, while critiquing the slower performance compared to the A50. John McCann of TechRadar also positively described the phone's Super AMOLED display and large battery. GSMArena.com  gave the phone a rating of 3.8 out of 5, calling it a "very balanced mid-ranger", praising the phone's camera, battery and sAMOLED display, while critiquing the camera's low-light performance.

References

External links
 

Samsung smartphones
Phablets
Samsung Electronics
Android (operating system) devices
Mobile phones introduced in 2019
Mobile phones with multiple rear cameras
Mobile phones with 4K video recording